The Swiss Class A 3/5 locomotives were built between 1902 and 1922 for the Jura–Simplon Railway, and the Gotthard Railway. These railways were absorbed into Swiss Federal Railways in 1903. In total 111 4-6-0 locomotives of this type were built by Schweizerische Lokomotiv- und Maschinenfabrik in Winterthur, Switzerland.

Preservation
One locomotive of this type has been preserved. This is Number 705, built in 1904.

Models
Scale models of the A 3/5 have been produced in a number of scales, from the tiny 1:220 Z scale, up to 1:32 Gauge 1.

In popular culture

See also
 List of stock used by Swiss Federal Railways

References

A 3 5
4-6-0 locomotives
Steam locomotives of Switzerland
Preserved steam locomotives of Switzerland
SLM locomotives
Passenger locomotives
Standard gauge locomotives of Switzerland